The 1983 Tournament Players Championship was a golf tournament in Florida on the PGA Tour, held March 24–28 at TPC Sawgrass in Ponte Vedra Beach, southeast of Jacksonville. It was the tenth Tournament Players Championship. 

Heavy rains on Thursday delayed the start until Friday, with the final two rounds planned for Sunday. Thunderstorms on Sunday morning allowed only the third round to be completed, and the final round was held on Monday.

Hal Sutton, age 24, came from four strokes back with a final round 69 to win his second tour event, one stroke ahead of runner-up Bob Eastwood. Later in the year, Sutton won his only major title, the PGA Championship in August at Riviera. 

Defending champion Jerry Pate withdrew before the start, due to a lingering neck injury.

Sutton became the youngest champion of the TPC, formerly Mark Hayes, 27 in 1977. It was only for a year, as Fred Couples was five months younger at his win in 1984.

Venue

Despite refinements in the past year, the Pete Dye-designed course continued to be scrutinized by many.

Eligibility requirements 
Top 125 players on Final 1982 Official Money List
Players who appear in Top 25 on 1983 Official Money List as of March 14, 1981
Leading 1982 Official Money Winner on the Senior PGA Tour
All designated players
Any foreign player who meets the requirements of a designated Player, whether or not he is a PGA Tour member
Past winners of the Tournament Players Championship, World Series of Golf, PGA Championship, Masters Tournament and U.S. Open since 1973
Three "special selections," as determined by TPC Committee

Source:

Field
John Adams, Isao Aoki, George Archer, Seve Ballesteros, Miller Barber, Andy Bean, Chip Beck, Woody Blackburn, Jim Booros, Bill Britton, Brad Bryant, George Burns, Bob Byman, Rex Caldwell, Antonio Cerda Jr., Bobby Clampett, Lennie Clements, Jim Colbert, Bobby Cole, Frank Conner, Charles Coody, John Cook, Fred Couples, Ben Crenshaw, Jim Dent, Bruce Devlin, Terry Diehl, Mike Donald, Bob Eastwood, Danny Edwards, David Edwards, Dave Eichelberger, Lee Elder, Nick Faldo, Keith Fergus, Forrest Fezler, Ed Fiori, Bruce Fleisher, Raymond Floyd, John Fought, Al Geiberger, Gibby Gilbert, Bob Gilder, David Graham, Lou Graham, Thomas Gray, Hubert Green, Jay Haas, Gary Hallberg, Dan Halldorson, Phil Hancock, Morris Hatalsky, Vance Heafner, Lon Hinkle, Scott Hoch, Mike Holland, Joe Inman, Hale Irwin, Peter Jacobsen, Barry Jaeckel, Tom Jenkins, Tom Kite, Gary Koch, Wayne Levi, Bruce Lietzke, Pat Lindsey, Mark Lye, John Mahaffey, Roger Maltbie, Mike McCullough, Mark McCumber, Pat McGowan, Mark McNulty, Steve Melnyk, Allen Miller, Johnny Miller, Jeff Mitchell, Larry Mize, Gil Morgan, Jodie Mudd, Bob Murphy, Tsuneyuki Nakajima, Jim Nelford, Larry Nelson, Jack Nicklaus, Mike Nicolette, Greg Norman, Tim Norris, Andy North, Mark O'Meara, Peter Oosterhuis, Arnold Palmer, Calvin Peete, Mark Pfeil, Dan Pohl, Don Pooley, Greg Powers, Tom Purtzer, Victor Regalado, Mike Reid, Jack Renner, Bill Rogers, Clarence Rose, Bob Shearer, Jim Simons, Scott Simpson, Tim Simpson, J. C. Snead, Ed Sneed, Craig Stadler, Payne Stewart, Curtis Strange, Ron Streck, Mike Sullivan, Hal Sutton, Doug Tewell, Leonard Thompson, Jim Thorpe, Lee Trevino, Howard Twitty, Tommy Valentine, Bobby Wadkins, Lanny Wadkins, Denis Watson, Tom Watson, D. A. Weibring, Tom Weiskopf, Larry Ziegler, Fuzzy Zoeller
 Defending champion Jerry Pate withdrew due to a lingering neck injury.

Round summaries

First round
Friday, March 25, 1983

Rain washed out play on Thursday, and the final two rounds were rescheduled for Sunday.

Source:

Second round
Saturday, March 26, 1983

With two rounds planned for Sunday, the cut was set at 149 (+5), reducing the field to 67. The eight players on 150, who would normally have made the cut, received prize money.

Source:

Third round
Sunday, March 27, 1983

Officials had hoped to complete the event with 36 holes on Sunday. Thunderstorms in the morning delayed play for three hours, and the final round was moved to Monday.

Source:

Final round
Monday, March 28, 1983

References

External links
The Players Championship website

1983
1983 in golf
1983 in American sports
1983 in sports in Florida
March 1983 sports events in the United States